This is a list of the Philippines women's national basketball team results. This list includes non-competitive matches against foreign teams.

By year

2022

2021

2019

2017

References

Results
Basketball games by national team